Ian Wilson (13 October 1932 – 8 March 2013) was an Irish cricketer. He played three first-class matches for Ireland between 1956 and 1961.

References

External links
 

1932 births
2013 deaths
Irish cricketers
People from Clonmel